Lucy Shelton is an American soprano best known for her performance of contemporary music. She graduated from The Putney School in 1961 and Pomona College in 1965.

The only artist to receive the International Walter W. Naumberg Award twice (as a soloist and as a chamber musician), Shelton has performed repertoire from Bach to Boulez in major recital, chamber and orchestral venues throughout the world. A native Californian, Shelton's musical training began early with the study of both piano and flute. After graduating from Pomona College, she pursued singing at the New England Conservatory and at the Aspen Music School, where she studied with Jan de Gaetani.

Shelton has taught at the Cleveland Institute of Music, the New England Conservatory, and the Eastman School of Music. She is currently on the faculties of the Contemporary Performance Program at the Manhattan School of Music, Tanglewood Music Center, and coaches privately at her studio in New York City. She has recorded for Deutsche Grammophon, KOCH International, Marco Polo, Bridge Records, Unicorn-Kanchana and Virgin Classics.

References

External links
The Ensemble Sospeso - Lucy Shelton musician profile
Art of the States: Lucy Shelton performance of To Wake the Dead (1978) by Stephen Albert
 http://www.naxos.com/person/Lucy_Shelton/689.htm
 http://www.bach-cantatas.com/Bio/Shelton-Lucy.htm
Interview with Lucy Shelton, May 6, 1991

American sopranos
Living people
The Putney School alumni
Pomona College alumni
Cleveland Institute of Music faculty
20th-century American women opera  singers
21st-century American women opera  singers
Women music educators
Year of birth missing (living people)
American women academics